Edgar Esteban Dueñas Peñaflor (born 5 March 1983) is a Mexican former professional footballer who played as a defender.

International career
During the 2011 CONCACAF Gold Cup, Dueñas, and four other members of the Mexico national team, tested positive for the banned substance of Clenbuterol and were withdrawn from the squad. Later, all players were exonerated as FIFA determined that the accused had ingested the banned substance through contaminated meat that had been inadvertently served during a pre-tournament training camp.

However, World Anti-Doping Agency appealed to the Court of Arbitration for Sport to request a ban. On 12 October 2011 the request was withdrawn when the full record was made available to WADA.

Career statistics

International

Honours
Toluca
Primera División de México: Apertura 2005, Apertura 2008, Bicentenario 2010

Individual
Primera División de México Center back of the tournament: Bicentenario 2010

References

External links

1983 births
Living people
Footballers from Guadalajara, Jalisco
Association football defenders
Mexican footballers
Mexico international footballers
CONCACAF Gold Cup-winning players
2009 CONCACAF Gold Cup players
2011 CONCACAF Gold Cup players
Deportivo Toluca F.C. players
Chiapas F.C. footballers
Club Puebla players
Potros UAEM footballers
Liga MX players